Tachysphex is a genus of square-headed wasps in the family Crabronidae. There are over 450 described species in Tachysphex.

See also
 List of Tachysphex species

References

Further reading

External links

 

Crabronidae
Apoidea genera
Taxonomy articles created by Polbot